is a railway station on the Sanyo Main Line, operated by West Japan Railway Company (JR West) in Shimonoseki, Yamaguchi, Japan. Kyushu Railway Company (JR Kyushu) and Japan Freight Railway Company (JR Freight) services also use this station. The company boundary between JR West and JR Kyushu is at the west end of this station where there is an entrance signal from Moji.

Lines

 West Japan Railway Company (JR West)
 Sanyo Main Line (for Hatabu, Shin-shimonoseki)
 Sanin Main Line 
Next station Hatabu is the terminal station of Sanin Line. All trains run to Shimonoseki through the Sanyo Main Line.
 Kyushu Railway Company (JR Kyushu)
 Sanyo Main Line (for Moji)

History
Kanmon Renrakusen (関門連絡船, Shimonoseki Moji Railway Ferry) was started. The station was located about 700m east from today's location.
  1 June 1902: Changed to Shimonoseki Station according to the change of the city name.
 11 September 1905: San'yō Railway started Kanfu Renrakusen (関釜連絡船, Shimonoseki Pusan Railway Ferry).
  1 December 1906: San'yō Railway was nationalized.
 20 December 1930: Kawasaki Ship (川崎汽船) started Kanrei Renrakusen (関麗連絡船, Shimonseki Yeosu Railway Ferry).
 27 November 1938: Sanyō Electric Tram (山陽電気軌道) Station was open in front of the station.
  1 July 1942: Kanmon Tunnel (関門トンネル, Shimonoseki Moji tunnel) was opened.
 15 November 1942: Station was moved to today's location.
 May 1945: Kanrei Renrakusen stopped.
 Jun 1945: Kanfu Renrakusen stopped.
 25 December 1946: Tram station was moved in front of the new station.
 31 October 1964: Kanmon Renrakusen stopped.
  7 February 1971: Tram stopped.
  1 April 1987: Privatization of JNR, the station becomes part of the JR West network.
 29 September 1999: Shimonoseki Station massacre, at least 5 deaths with 10 injuries.
 7 January 2006: A main station building fire with collapsed, and a 74-year-old man arrested of suspicion of arson.

Surrounding area

JR Shimonoseki station and Buzenda area
Shops
 Sea Mall Shimonoseki (largest shopping center in West Japan when it was built)
Shimonoseki Daimaru (department store)
Wedding Hall
 Buzenda Shopping Street (the most famous downtown in Yamaguchi Prefecture)
 Green Mall shopping street (Korean Town )
 Nagato Market

Sightseeing
 Kaikyo Yume Tower (Kaikyo Messe Shimonoseki)
 Hiyoriyama Park
Hotels
Shimonoseki Tokyu Inn
Via Inn Shimonoseki
Shimonoseki Eki-nishi Washington Hotel Plaza
Toyoko Inn Shimonoseki-eki Higashi-guchi
Shimonoseki Station Hotel
Green Hotel Shimonoseki
Hotel Wing International Shimonoseki
Hotel 38th Shimonoseki
Prince Hotel Shimonoseki

Others
 Shimonoseki Port (Foreign Access Zone)
 Shimonoseki Port International Terminal 
 Shimonoseki Fishing Port
 Shimonoseki Citizen hall

Karato 
Shops
 SunLive Karato(Shopping center)
 Karato shopping street
 Kamon Wharf (fresh fish shop and restaurant, etc.)

Sightseeing
 Kaikyokan (Aquarium) 
 Mt. Hinoyama (268.2m)
 Karato Market (Fresh fish shop etc.)
 Former British Consulate (built in 1906)
 Former Akita Company Building (built in 1915)
 Nabe-cho Post Office (built in 1900)
 Akama Shrine(built in 1191)
 Kameyama Hachimangu Shrine (built in 859)
 Kanmon Straits (Kanmonkyo Bridge)
 Dan-no-ura (Battle of Dan-no-ura)

Hotels
 Shimonoseki Grand Hotel
 Karato Central Hotel
 Kaikyo View Shimonoseki
 Shunpanro
 Tokyo Dai-ichi Hotel Shimonoseki
 Shimonoseki City Hinoyama Youth Hostel

Others
 Shimonoseki City Hall
 Arcaport development area

Transportation

Ferries from Shimonoseki Port International Terminal
The Kanpu ferry to Busan in South Korea regularly.
The Orient ferry to Qingdao in China regularly.
The Orient ferry to Shanghai in China regularly.

Bus
Bus company (A loop-line bus in the city.) : Sanden Kohtsu Co.,Ltd.
Shimonoseki Station Bus Terminal : Intercity bus services (arrival and departure at Shimonoseki Station Bus Terminal) go to the following destinations: Osaka, Kobe, Fukuoka, Kitakyushu Airport, etc.

Nearby Shinkansen Station 
Shin-Shimonoseki Station (Sanyō Shinkansen)

See also
Shimonoseki
Buzenda

References

Railway stations in Yamaguchi Prefecture
Railway stations in Japan opened in 1901
Stations of West Japan Railway Company